Abu Ahmad 'Abd al-Rahman ibn 'Ali ibn Marzuban Tabib Marzubani, better simply known as Ibn Marzuban, was a Persian official and physician who served the Buyids. He was a disciple of Avicenna.

Not much is known about him; he traced his descent back to a family native to Isfahan. However, during the most of his lifetime he lived in Baghdad and in Khuzestan instead of his native city. During his early life, he was educated in science and religious law. He later became the judge of Shushtar and the head of the famous al-'Adudi Hospital in Baghdad. Ibn Marzuban later died in 1006 at Shushtar.

References

Sources 
 

Scholars under the Buyid dynasty
11th-century Iranian physicians
10th-century Iranian physicians
1006 deaths
Year of birth unknown